Parapotamos (Greek: Παραπόταμος Λάρισας) is a settlement of the municipal unit of Makrychori, which is part of the municipality of Tempi, northern Greece. It is situated on the right bank of the river Pineios. The people of the area are mostly farmers and the settlement is famous for its olive production.

External links
Παραπόταμος Λάρισας on wikimapia

Populated places in Larissa (regional unit)